Alfred Edmund Godsal DSO, Croix de Guerre (1884 – 10 May 1918) was a British officer of the Royal Navy who commanded  in the First Ostend Raid on 23 April 1918.  In the early hours of 10 May 1918 he was killed in action commanding  during the Second Ostend Raid. This event is marked each year in Ostend as Vindictive Day.

Early life and family
Godsal was born at Henbury House, Sturminster Marshall, Dorset in 1884, the son of Philip Thomas Godsal, of Iscoyd Park, Flintshire, and Ellen Henrietta Parke. His mother's family were land owners in Sturminster Marshall.

Two of Alfred Godsal's siblings, Major Walter Hugh Godsal DSO, MC of the Durham Light Infantry and Margaret Louisa Godsal, also died in the 15 months which preceded his own death.

Godsal was a cousin of Wilfred Parke an early naval aviator who was the first pilot to make an observed recovery from a spin and who was killed in 1912.

Career
After attending AJ de Winton's school in Slough, Alfred Godsal joined HMS Britannia Royal Naval College at Dartmouth in September 1899 as a naval cadet.

He then became a "Five Wonner", having the rare distinction of achieving first class passes in seamanship, navigation, gunnery, torpedoes, and signals.

After short appointments, including ,  and  he joined  in 1907 to qualify as a specialist Torpedo Officer.  This was followed by the advanced torpedo course which included wireless telegraphy.

After several torpedo-related jobs, in 1910-12 he joined  on the China Station. 
While there he was loaned for a time to the Yangtze River gunboat Kinsha, including a brief period in command whilst awaiting the arrival of the new captain. HMS Kinsha, previously known as SS Pioneer had belonged to Samuel Cornell Plant but was requisitioned by the British navy during the Boxer Rebellion.

He was promoted to commander in June 1917 and continued in that ship until volunteering for the "special operation" of Zeebrugge/Ostend.

This was unsuccessful when both ships, unable to find the harbour entrance, ran aground and had to be abandoned. He was slightly wounded.

With the apparently successful blocking of the Zeebrugge-Bruges canal, the Ostend canal became increasingly significant. Several officers, led by Godsal and his first lieutenant, Victor Crutchley, urged Admiral Roger Keyes to allow a second attack. , the ship selected to block the canal entrance, was manned entirely by volunteers, mostly drawn from'HMS Brilliant and HMS Sirius. Godsal was again in command and was killed in the attack.

References

1884 births
1918 deaths
People from Dorset
Royal Navy officers of World War I
British military personnel killed in World War I
Companions of the Distinguished Service Order
Recipients of the Croix de Guerre 1914–1918 (France)